Manuel Esteban Soto (born 28 January 1994) is a Colombian male racewalking athlete who competes in the 20 kilometres race walk. He represented his country at the 2016 Summer Olympics and the 2012 IAAF World Race Walking Cup.

He failed to finish in his international debut at the 2011 World Youth Championships in Athletics but took a bronze medal at the South American Race Walking Championships in 2012. A succession of age category gold medals followed at the 2013 South American Junior Championships in Athletics, the 2013 Pan American Race Walking Cup and the 2014 South American Under-23 Championships in Athletics.

He made his senior debut at the 2015 Pan American Race Walking Cup, sharing in the team silver medal. He gained selection for Colombia at the 2016 Summer Olympics and finished with a personal best of 1:20:36 minutes for the 20 km walk in ninth place.

He competed at the 2020 Summer Olympics.

Personal bests
10,000 metres race walk – 41:55.95 (2013)
10 kilometres race walk – 41:19 (2013)
20,000 metres race walk – 1:23:22.7 (2014)
20 kilometres race walk – 1:20:36 (2016)

All information from All-Athletics.

International competitions

References

External links

Living people
1994 births
Colombian male racewalkers
Olympic athletes of Colombia
Athletes (track and field) at the 2016 Summer Olympics
Athletes (track and field) at the 2020 Summer Olympics
Place of birth missing (living people)
Central American and Caribbean Games medalists in athletics
People from Huila Department
21st-century Colombian people